Shomanay district (Karakalpak: Шоманай районы, Shomanay rayonı) is a district in the Republic of Karakalpakstan. The capital lies at the city Shomanay.

There is one city Shomanay and seven rural communities.

References

Karakalpakstan
Districts of Uzbekistan